Coccidula is a genus of lady beetles in the family Coccinellidae. There are five species described in Coccidula.

Species
These five species belong to the genus Coccidula:
 Coccidula lepida LeConte, 1852 (snow lady beetle)
Coccidula litophiloides Reitter, 1890
Coccidula reitteri Dodge, 1938
 Coccidula rufa (Herbst, 1783)
 Coccidula scutellata (Herbst, 1783)

References

Further reading

External links

 

Coccinellidae genera